Dolenje Poljane is a settlement in the hills southeast of Stari Trg pri Ložu in the Municipality of Loška Dolina in the Inner Carniola region of Slovenia. The area also includes the hamlet of Zgornje Poljane.

The chapel in Dolenje Poljane is dedicated to Our Lady of Sorrows. The church in Zgornje Poljane is built on a hill and is dedicated to Saint Andrew. Both belong to the Parish of Stari Trg.

References

External links 
Dolenje Poljane on Geopedia

Populated places in the Municipality of Loška Dolina